The French International Lady Juniors Amateur Championship, known also as the Esmond Trophy since 1972, is an annual amateur golf tournament in France for women under 21. 

The match play tournament has been held annually at Golf de Saint-Cloud in Paris since 1927, and in its current form since 1959.

Winners

Source:

References

External links
Fédération française de golf

Amateur golf tournaments
Junior golf tournaments
Golf tournaments in France